The Baltic Development Forum is an independent think-tank and non-profit high-level and agenda-setting networking organisation with strategic partners and sponsors from large companies, major cities, institutional investors, business associations and academia in the Baltic Sea Region. The network involves more than 8,000 decision-makers from all over the region and beyond.

History

March 2014 former Minister for Foreign Affairs, Mrs. Lene Espersen replaced the interim Chairwoman, Mrs. Helle Bechgaard as chairwoman of Baltic Development Forum.

Until November 2011, Baltic Development Forum was chaired by Uffe Ellemann-Jensen, Minister for Foreign Affairs of Denmark 1982–1993. Mr. Ellemann-Jensen is co-founder of Baltic Development Forum (in 1998) and the Council of the Baltic Sea States (1992). Former CEO of Confederation of Danish Industry Hans Skov Christensen replaced Uffe Ellemann-Jensen as chairman. When Hans Skov Christensen died in autumn 2013 he was provisionally replaced by Member of the Board, Mrs. Helle Bechgaard.

The Baltic Development Forum Honorary Board and Advisory Board consist of high-level political dignitaries and prominent business executives and researchers representing the entire Baltic Sea Region.

Director of Baltic Development Forum is Hans Brask since August 2007. His background is in international affairs. He holds a MA in Political Science from the University of Aarhus (1990) and an MA in History and Philosophy from the University of Essex, UK (1990).

Mission 
The mission of Baltic Development Forum is to promote the Baltic Sea Region as an integrated, prosperous and internationally competitive growth region, to position the Baltic Sea Region in the EU and on the global map. Baltic Development Forum has consolidated its position as internationally recognized think-tank and networking organization that wants to inspire and challenge national and international decision-makers within business and government in the Baltic Sea Region. The Region's potential and challenges are highlighted at the Summit as an important part of an increasingly globalised world. BDF offers a unique platform for innovative thinking, informal cross-sector/cross-border/cross-level encounters and concrete new business opportunities with a global perspective.

Main activities 
The Annual Summit takes place in different capitals and metropolis in the Baltic Sea Region - 1999: Copenhagen; 2000: Malmö; 2001: Copenhagen; 2002: St. Petersburg; 2003: Riga; 2004: Hamburg; 2005: Stockholm; 2006: Helsinki; 2007: Tallinn; 2008: Copenhagen/Malmö; 2009: Stockholm; 2010: Vilnius; 2011: Gdańsk; 2012: Copenhagen/Malmö; 2013: Riga. 2014: Turku, Finland.

Baltic Development Forum's Baltic Sea Award has been established together with Swedbank as sponsor in 2007. Recipient of the Award is given to personalities that have made an extraordinary contribution to the future of the region.

Baltic Development Forum publishes different reports in order to support a common regional agenda for integration, innovation and sustainable growth. The State of the Region Report has developed into a key reference document on tracking the region's competitiveness and economic development. Nordic Council of Ministers, European Investment Bank, and Nordic Investment Bank have co-sponsored this report.

Baltic Development Forum also carries out different cooperation projects with partners from many parts of the region in the field of energy, water, investment promotion, transport, branding and ICT.

Baltic Development Forum has been a key supporter of the EU's adoption of an EU strategy for the Baltic Sea Region. In October 2009, the European Council of the EU endorsed the first EU strategy for a macro-regional area of the EU. The Baltic Sea Region thereby has the chance to make an innovative combination of European and regional integration and news efforts to improve territorial cohesion of the EU according to EU's Strategy for the Baltic Sea Region.

The History of the Region 
The Baltic Sea Region comprises 11 nations and more than 100 million inhabitants. The Baltic Development Forum defines the Baltic Sea Region as including the Baltic countries Estonia, Latvia and Lithuania, the Nordic countries of Denmark, Finland, Iceland, Norway and Sweden, Northern Germany (Hansestadt Hamburg, Mecklenburg-Vorpommern and Schleswig-Holstein), Northern Poland (Pomorskie, Warminsko-Mazurskie and Zachodnio-Pomorskie), and Russia's Northwestern region including Kaliningrad.

The region shares many historical ties, which often are symbolized by the legacy of the Hanse around the Baltic Sea. Thus, the Baltic Sea has been the facilitator of integrative processes in more than 1000 years with more intensive periods than other. Naturally, the Cold War to a large extent hindered extended cooperation, but when the Berlin Wall fell in 1989 new strong ties emerged. Nowadays the Baltic Sea Region is interlaced by a myriad of formal and informal cross-border organisations and fora signalising the multidimensional scale of interaction.

References

External links
 

Baltic Sea
Think tanks